The 2002 NCAA Division I Women's Lacrosse Championship was the 21st annual single-elimination tournament to determine the national champion of Division I NCAA women's college lacrosse. The championship game was played at Diane Geppi-Aikens Field in Baltimore, Maryland during May 2002. All NCAA Division I women's lacrosse programs were eligible for this championship. A total of 16 teams were invited to participate.

Princeton defeated Georgetown, 12–7, to win their second national championship. This was the first time since 1994 (also won by Princeton) that Maryland did not win the national title. 

The leading scorer for the tournament was Lauren Simone from Princeton (23 goals). Simone was also named the tournament's Most Outstanding Player.

Qualification

Tournament bracket

All-tournament team 
Katie McCorry, Cornell
Jaimee Reynolds, Cornell
Melissa Biles, Georgetown
Erin Elbe, Georgetown
Chandler Vicchio, Georgetown
Beth Ames, North Carolina
Jazmine Norton, North Carolina
Rachel Becker, Princeton
Sarah Kolodner, Princeton
Whitney Miller, Princeton
Brooke Owens, Princeton
Lauren Simone, Princeton (Most outstanding player)

See also 
 NCAA Division II Women's Lacrosse Championship 
 NCAA Division III Women's Lacrosse Championship
 2002 NCAA Division I Men's Lacrosse Championship

References

NCAA Division I Women's Lacrosse Championship
NCAA Division I Women's Lacrosse Championship
NCAA Women's Lacrosse Championship